The history of boxing in the Philippines is the history of boxing and the evolution and progress of the sport in the Philippines. In the Philippines, boxing is one of its most popular sports, together with basketball, due to the many accolades it has brought to the country, having produced 45 major world champions (including those of Filipino heritage), one of the most in the world. Despite not having won a gold medal in boxing, the Philippines has had multiple Olympic standouts, with 8 out of its 12 total Olympic medals coming from boxing, along with some of the greatest fighters in the history of the sport. Filipino greats like Pancho Villa, Flash Elorde and Ceferino Garcia are members of the two highly respected boxing hall of fames - International Boxing Hall of Fame (IBHOF) and World Boxing Hall of Fame (WBHF) thus, giving the Philippines the most number of boxing hall of fame members out of Asia.

Golden ages of Philippine boxing
Before the Spaniards and Americans came to the Philippines, Filipinos had their own kind of boxing known as suntukan,"bare-hand fighting" in Tagalog, generally believed to have evolved from a Filipino knife fighting technique called "kali". During the Spanish colonization martial arts and fight sports were banned, so it was driven underground where the lack of knives and rattan sticks lead to fist fighting.

First golden age of Philippine boxing

The evolution of Philippine boxing began after the Spanish–American War, where Spain ceded its colonial territories, namely Puerto Rico, Guam, and the Philippines to the United States as agreed in the 1898 Treaty of Paris. Some reports state U.S. soldiers brought modern boxing to the Philippines, evidenced by a pair boxing gloves made by Sol Levinson of San Francisco. Another story tells of a renegade soldier brought some boxing gloves to Filipino prisoners and taught them how to use them.  However, it was generally believed that three Americans were responsible for the evolution of boxing in the country namely: Frank Churchill and the Tait brothers (Eddie and Stewart) Eddie and Stewart Tait, also dubbed as "Barnums of Borneo", were amusement park entrepreneurs who established carnivals and horse racing tracks in Manila, who arrived in the country in 1902. Eddie, believed to be a boxing enthusiast, wanted to attract crowds by teaching Filipino locals some western boxing lessons for free to create American-style Filipino boxers.

In 1921, boxing was legalized in the Philippines and began to flourish. Frank Churchill joined by the Tait brothers, established the Olympic Boxing Club in Manila. During this time, the country saw the first batch of great Filipino fighters such as Dencio Cabanela, Speedy Dado, the Flores brothers (Francisco, Elino, Macario and Ireneo), Pete Sarmiento, Sylvino Jamito, Macario Villon and the legendary Pancho Villa. The first golden age of Philippine boxing emerge as Pancho Villa won the universal world flyweight championship from Welshman Jimmy Wilde to become the first ever Asian and Filipino world champion. Villa defended his title three times including a fight in the Philippines with fellow Filipino Clever Sencio where he won by fifteen-round decision, which at the time, nobody thought it would be the last victory of his young career. The glorious era was short-lived following the ring deaths of popular fighters Dencio Cabanela and Clever Sencio along with the death of Pancho Villa from Ludwig's angina and their influential promoter Frank Churchill.

There was also the Filipino-Spanish boxer, Luis Logan, who at one time or another held the title Oriental welterweight and heavyweight champion. Logan's boxing career spanned 1925–1940; and spent half his boxing career in Spain, Argentina, outside of the Philippines.

On October 2, 1939, a sudden uplift came when Ceferino Garcia won the NYSAC world middleweight championship from American Fred Apostoli at the Madison Square Garden, New York, United States. On December 23, 1939, Garcia successfully defended his title for the first time against American Glen Lee in front of his countrymen inside the Rizal Memorial Sports Complex which was the first world title bout ever recorded in the Philippine islands. Garcia also competed with some of the best boxers ever like Barney Ross and Henry Armstrong, to whom he denied his fourth title in four weight divisions through a draw. However, he then lost at the hands of Ken Overlin, unable to land his famous bolo punch and losing the title.

Second golden age of Philippine boxing

On July 20, 1955, Filipino boxing fans saw the birth of Philippine boxing's second golden era as a Cebuano boxer named Gabriel "Flash" Elorde beat the then reigning world featherweight champion and later Hall of Famer Sandy Saddler in a non-title bout at the Rizal Memorial Sports Complex. Elorde went on to win the world super featherweight championship from Harold Gomes by a seventh-round knockout on March 16, 1960. Elorde kept his world title inside a division record of 7 years and 2 months with 10 successful defenses, including a one-round knockout of Gomes in a rematch. Flash Elorde, during his time, was one of the busiest fighters who traveled to fight very often. A great and fearless fighter, Elorde was one of the most beloved Filipino athletes since Pancho Villa. In this Elorde inspired period, twenty world champions were created spanning from Roberto Cruz to Gerry Peñalosa along with the formation of the "Big Four of Professional Boxing" or the major sanctioning bodies, namely the WBA, WBC, IBF, and WBO. However, as time goes by, boxing was becoming less popular in the country because of many alternative sports including basketball until Manny Pacquiao came.

Third golden age of Philippine boxing (present)

A Filipino boxer named Manny Pacquiao was an entertaining star in the local boxing television show called "Blow-by-Blow" by the famed Filipino manager and promoter Rod Nazario. Viewers became accustomed to Pacquiao's name not only because of his aggressive style but also due to his unique looks and catchy surname. Pacquiao's ascendancy heralded a new wave of Filipino boxers and marks the third great era of Philippine boxing.

On December 4, 1998, Pacquiao upset Thai Champion Chatchai Sasakul in Thailand to win the Lineal and WBC flyweight championship (his first world title). On his title defense, Pacquiao lost his title on the scale and was knocked out in the fight by Medgoen Singsurat of Thailand. Pacquiao lost his WBC title on the scales as he was unable to make the flyweight limit. Pacquiao gained weight and skipped the super flyweight and bantamweight divisions to fight at super bantamweight division. Pacquiao, for the second time in his career, was the heavy underdog against South African Lehlohonolo Ledwaba, the reigning IBF super bantamweight champion. On June 23, 2001, Pacquiao dethroned Ledwaba to win his second world title in two different weight divisions. In 2003, Pacquiao's career rose to its peak as he stopped the then reigning Lineal and The Ring featherweight champion Marco Antonio Barrera of Mexico via 11th-round technical knockout. Since that time, Pacquiao has acquired three lineal titles and four major (WBC & IBF) world titles along six different divisions--flyweight (112 lbs.), super bantamweight (122 lbs.), featherweight (126 lbs.), super featherweight (130 lbs.), lightweight (135 lbs.) and light welterweight (140 lbs.).

On November 14, 2009, Pacquiao surpassed Oscar De La Hoya's record of six-division titles by stopping WBO welterweight champion Miguel Angel Cotto to win his seventh title across seven divisions. One year later, he made history by being the first boxer ever to win eight world titles in eight weight divisions as he dominated Mexican slugger Antonio Margarito to win the vacant WBC light middleweight title. Since 2003, Pacquiao amassed a record of 21 wins, 3 defeats and 1 draw in his last 25 fights. The Filipino fighter defeated some of the best opposition available on the way to superstardom (earning the nickname "the Mexicutioner") including Mexicans Marco Antonio Barrera, Erik Morales, Juan Manuel Márquez and Antonio Margarito, British Ricky Hatton, Puerto Rican Miguel Cotto, and Americans Oscar De La Hoya, Shane Mosley and Timothy Bradley.

The "Pacquiao Wave" regenerated boxing in the Philippines, inspiring a new generation of boxers to aim ever higher. Nonito Donaire, one of the Pacquiao-wave fighters, became the second Asian to win four world titles in four weight divisions by defeating South African Simpiwe Vetyeka to claim the WBA featherweight title on May 31, 2014. In 2017, Donnie Nietes became the third Filipino boxer to win world titles in three different weight divisions when he defeated Thailand's Komgrich Nantapech in May 2017. In Dec. 31 2018, Donnie Nietes became the third Filipino boxer and third Asian to win world titles in Four different weight divisions when he defeated Japanese Kazuto Ioka via split decision on New Year's Eve, winning the vacant World Boxing Organization belt at the Wynn Palace in Macau.

Philippines' contribution to boxing

The Philippines is one of the founding member nations of the World Boxing Council (WBC) and Oriental and Pacific Boxing Federation (OPBF). Filipino boxers also contributed to the history of boxing from rules and techniques to records and achievements. Pancho Villa is not only the first Asian and Filipino world champion but is also described as one of the cleanest boxers before the proper rules were established. Ceferino Garcia is credited as the inventor of the "bolo punch". However, according to Tahoma News-Tribune, a fellow Filipino boxer named Macario Flores was reportedly using it. Gabriel "Flash" Elorde still holds the record for longest reign in the super featherweight or junior lightweight (130 lbs.) division - 7 years, 2 months and 29 days with 10 title defenses. His success was due to his innovative footwork and maneuvers which he learned from training Balintawak Eskrima with his father "Tatang" Elorde who was the Eskrima champion of Cebu. Elorde's style from eskrima has been adopted by many boxers, including his friend Muhammad Ali, which influenced the out-boxer style of boxing.

While Donnie Nietes holds as the longest Filipino world champion in the light flyweight division. On November 13, 2010, Manny Pacquiao entered the Guinness Book of World Records for being the first ever boxer to win eight world titles in eight (8) different divisions (see also Octuple Champion) by defeating Mexican Antonio Margarito via 12-round unanimous decision to claim the vacant WBC light middleweight championship.

Philippines' popular ring officials

The Philippines has produced respected ring officials. Referee Carlos "Sonny" Padilla officiated the famous "Thrilla in Manila" match between Muhammad Ali and Joe Frazier in 1975. He worked as third man in the ring in many big matches for over 25 years.

In 2012, the World Boxing Council awarded Rey Danseco the Judge of the Year. He received the accolade in a rite held during the 50th Annual WBC Convention at the Grand Oasis Hotel in Cancun, Mexico. To date, Danseco is the only Asian boxing ring official to win an award of such magnitude. He is also a multiple Judge of the Year awardee in the Philippines until he moved to the US in 2012.

Danseco judged the world championship fights of some big names in boxing of his generation, such as Canelo Alvarez, Errol Spence Jr.,   Danny Garcia, Robert Guerrero, Julio César Chávez, Bernard Hopkins, Austin Trout, Gerry Penalosa, Pongsaklek Wonjongkam, Badou Jack, Jorge Arce, Jhonny González, Adonis Stevenson, Tony Bellew, Josh Taylor, Toshiaki Nishioka, Shawn Porter, Edgar Sosa, Miguel Berchelt, Leo Santa Cruz, Abner Mares, Amir Khan, Daniel Dubois, Jamel Herring, Jessica McCaskill, Regis Prograis, and Khalid Yafai.

Padilla refereed or judged the fights of notable world champions, including Muhammad Ali, Joe Frazier, Alexis Arguello, Erbito Salavarria, Leon Spinks, Ken Norton, Larry Holmes, Sugar Ray Leonard, Lupe Pintor, Roberto Durán, Marvin Hagler, Roberto Durán, Bobby Chacon, Pipino Cuevas, Julio César Chávez, Michael Spinks, Mike Tyson, Michael Moorer, George Foreman, Azumah Nelson, Riddick Bowe, Terry Norris, Ray Mercer, Iran Barkley, Humberto Gonzalez, Roger Mayweather, Kennedy McKinney, Johnny Tapia, Marco Antonio Barrera, Antonio Tarver, and Filipino greats Manny Pacquiao, Dodie Boy Penalosa, Erbito Salavarria, Ben Villaflor, and Rolando Navarette in his career from 1967 until his retirement in year 2000.

List of men's professional boxing world champions

The following is a list of filipino boxing champions who have held titles from one or more of the "Big Four" organizations (WBA, WBC, IBF, WBO) and The Ring. 

In December 2000, the WBA created an unprecedented situation of having a split championship in the same weight class by introducing a new title called Super world, commonly referred to simply as Super. The Super champion is highly regarded as the WBA's primary champion, while the World champion – commonly known as the Regular champion by boxing publications – is only considered the primary champion by the other three major sanctioning bodies (WBC, IBF, and WBO) if the Super title is vacant.

A Unified champion is a boxer that holds the Regular title and a world title from another major sanctioning body (WBC, IBF, WBO) simultaneously. An Undisputed champion as defined by the WBA, only needs to hold three of the four major titles but in some cases they may change a Super champion into an Undisputed champion after a failed title defense (e.g. Anselmo Moreno losing to Juan Payano and Chris John losing to Simpiwe Vetyeka). This is not to be confused by professional boxing's own definition of an undisputed champion, in which a boxer must hold all four major titles.

Other former international/national-world boxing commissions and organizations from the beginning of boxing are also included here:
 New York State Athletic Commission  (NYSAC)
 National Boxing Association (NBA) - changed its name to World Boxing Association (WBA) in 1962

Note
Interim titles are not included unless they get promoted to the official champion.
For WBA champions, only champions in the WBA primary lineage are listed.

List of WBA secondary champions

List of women's professional boxing world champions

The following is a list of filipina boxing champions who have held titles from one or more of the "Big Four" organizations (WBA, WBC, IBF, WBO) and The Ring.

Current titleholders in world boxing sanctioning bodies

Current titleholders in Philippine boxing sanctioning bodies

Philippines Games & Amusement Board

Philippines Boxing Federation

See also

Philippines national amateur boxing athletes
Thrilla in Manila

Lists
List of current world boxing champions
List of boxing triple champions
List of boxing quadruple champions
List of boxing quintuple champions
List of boxing sextuple champions
List of boxing sextuple champions
Octuple champion
List of WBA world champions
List of WBC world champions
List of IBF world champions
List of WBO world champions
List of The Ring world champions

References

Footnotes

Bibliography

 A look at the history of boxing in the Philippines - ESPN via Don Stradley, June 25, 2008
 The heartbeat of an entire nation - History defines the long love affair with the sport of boxing in the Philippines - ESPN via Nigel Collins, April 10, 2013
 The Origins of Philippine Boxing - Journal of Combative Sport via Joseph R. Svinth, July 2001
 Filipino World Champions - Boxrec.com
 World Champions by Nationality - Boxrec.com
 Filipino American Boxers - Boxrec.com
 Former World Champions - Philboxing.com
 Current Champions - Philboxing.com
 Boxing List of Results and World Champions - Pilipinas United

External links
 Filipino World Champions - Boxrec.com
 World Champions by Nationality - Boxrec.com
 Filipino American Boxers - Boxrec.com
 Former World Champions - Philboxing.com
 Current Champions - PhilBoxing.com
 Boxing and Manny Pacquiao - MSN Philippines

Boxing in the Philippines